The First Family of Soul: The Best of the Five Stairsteps is a compilation album released by Buddah Records on November 6, 2001 for the family musical group The Five Stairsteps.

References

External links 
 The Stairsteps Official Website

2001 compilation albums
Rhythm and blues compilation albums
Buddah Records compilation albums
Five Stairsteps albums